Wólka Zawieprzycka  is a village in the administrative district of Gmina Serniki, within Lubartów County, Lublin Voivodeship, in eastern Poland.

References

Villages in Lubartów County